Hazara people make up the second or the third largest ethnic group in Afghanistan with 8–12 million population, making 20%–25% of the total population of Afghanistan (Some suggest the real population might reach 30%) where they mainly inhabit the Hazaristan region, as well as parts of Pakistan, especially Balochistan, and in Iran. The Hazaras have immigrated to Iran, Australia, Europe, North America, and... in the last several decades also as part of these two intertwined diasporan groupings, as part of the Hazara, and wider Afghan diaspora.

Politicians 

 Abdul Ali Mazari
 Muhammad Yusuf Khan Hazara
 Qazi Muhammad Isa
 Muhammad Ibrahim Khan
 Karim Khalili
 Sultan Ali Keshtmand
 Daoud Naji
 Ramazan Bashardost
 Mohammad Mohaqiq
 Qazi Muhammad Essa
 Habiba Sarabi
 Sima Samar
 Hussain Ali Yousafi
 Muhammad Ali Jawid
 Maryam Monsef
 Abdul Khaliq Hazara
 Akram Yari
 Ahmad Behzad
 Jan Ali Changezi
 Qurban Ali Oruzgani
 Abdul Haq Shafaq
 Sayed Anwar Rahmati
 Azra Jafari
 Sayyid Ali Beheshti
 Shah Gul Rezai
 Sarwar Danish
 Sayed Nasir Ali Shah
 Haji Sayed Hussain Hazara
 Abdul Wahed Sorabi
 Azizullah Royesh
 Ahmad Shah Ramazan
 Dawood Ali Najafi
 Abdul Qayyum Sajjadi
 Ghulam Ali Wahdat
 Muhammad Hussain Sadiqi Nili
 Nasrullah Sadiqi Zada Nili
 Sayed Mustafa Kazemi
 Sayed Mansur Naderi
 Abbas Ibrahim Zada
 Muhammad Arif Shah Jahan
 Sayed Hussein Anwari
 Sayyed Mohammad Eqbal Munib
 Rahila Bibi Kobra Alamshahi
 Zahera Ahmadyar Mawlayee
 Abdul Taleb Zaki
 Asadullah Saadati
 Ghulam Husain Naseri
 Fahim Hashimy
 Abbas Noyan
 Muhammad Hussain Fahimi

Military personnel 
 General Muhammad Musa Khan
 Abdul Ali Mazari
 Mehdi Mujahid
 Commander Shafi Hazara
 General Khudaidad Khan
 General Murad Ali Murad
 Flight lieutenant Samad Ali Changezi
 Air marshal Sharbat Ali Changezi
 Younus Changezi
 Bibi Ayesha

Religious figures 

 Muhammad al-Fayadh
 Mohaqiq Kabuli
 Ismael Balkhi
 Sayyid Ali Beheshti
 Ali Mohaqiq Nasab

Writers, poets and people in the media 

 Faiz Muhammad Kateb
 Amir Khosrow Dehlavi
 Hassan Poladi
 Ismael Balkhi
 Haji Kazim Yazdani
 Kamran Mir Hazar
 Basir Ahang
 Mohsin Changezi
 Sayed Askar Mousavi
 Ali Baba Taj
 Ali-Shir Nava'i
 Ali Mohaqiq Nasab
 Qasim Akhgar
 Sayed Abutalib Mozaffari
 Jalila Haider

Actors 

 Atossa Leoni
 Shaima Rezayee
 Hussain Sadiqi
 Abid Ali Nazish
 Ali Ahmadi
 Nikbakht Noruz
 Shamila Shirzad

Singers 

 Sarwar Sarkhosh
 Dawood Sarkhosh
 Zahir Howaida
 Safdar Tawakoli
 Sayed Anwar Azad
 Elaha Soroor
 Shakeeb Hamdard
 Mr. Capone-E

Photographers 

 Barat Ali Batoor

Journalists 

 Malek Shafi'i

Directors 

 Burhan Qurbani

Sports

Football 

 Zohib Islam Amiri
 Moshtagh Yaghoubi
 Mustafa Amini
 Roholla Iqbalzadeh
 Rahmat Akbari
 Zahra Mahmoodi
 Khodadad Azizi
 Mohsin Ali
 Masih Saighani
 Omran Haydary
 Zelfy Nazary
 Massih Wassey
 Moshtaq Ahmadi
 Nadiem Amiri
 Omid Musawi

Basketball

 Fardaws Aimaq

Boxing 

 Haider Ali
 Abrar Hussain
 Hamid Rahimi

Karate 
 Kulsoom Hazara
 Meena Hazara
 Nargis Hameedullah
 Shahida Abbasi

Taekwondo 

 Rohullah Nikpai

Judo 

 Friba Razayee

Wrestling 

 Wakil Hussain Allahdad
 Mohammad Ebrahim Khedri

Wushu 

 Hussain Sadiqi

Martial arts 

 Ali Ahmadi

Tennis 

 Muzammil Murtaza

Business   

 Fatema Akbari
 Fahim Hashimy

Others 

 Abdul Khaliq Hazara
 Shukria Tabassum

See also 

 List of Afghanistanis

References 

 
 
Lists of people by ethnicity